The 2015 All-Ireland Senior Camogie Championship Final was the eighty-fourth All-Ireland Final and the deciding match of the 2015 All-Ireland Senior Camogie Championship, an inter-county camogie tournament for the top teams in Ireland. It took take place on Sunday 13 September in Croke Park.

The match was shown live on RTÉ Two with commentary by Marty Morrissey.

Cork won the title after a 1-13 to 0-9 victory against Galway.

References

Camogie
All-Ireland Senior Camogie Championship Finals
Cork county camogie team matches
All-Ireland Senior Camogie Championship Final
All-Ireland Senior Camogie Championship Final, 2015